The Haldane Society of Socialist Lawyers is a socialist and legal campaigning organisation in the United Kingdom.  It was founded in 1930 to provide legal support to the then Labour government. The Society was named after Viscount Haldane, a Liberal and subsequently Labour Party politician, who had been Lord Chancellor in H. H. Asquith's government from 1912 to 1915 and subsequently in 1924 during the first ever Labour administration.

Sir Stafford Cripps, Clement Attlee and John Platts-Mills were members.

It is now politically independent, unlike the Society of Labour Lawyers, which is affiliated to the Labour Party, and was formed after the society split in 1949 over the question of membership for members of the Communist Party.

Personnel
Its current chair is Declan Owens and its President is Michael Mansfield.

Affiliations
On the international level it is a member of the International Association of Democratic Lawyers and European Democratic Lawyers.

References

Political organisations based in London
Socialism in the United Kingdom
1930 establishments in the United Kingdom
Organizations established in 1930